Odin Elsford Stanley Langen (January 5, 1913 – July 6, 1976) was an American politician from the state of Minnesota. He served six terms in the United States House of Representatives from 1959 to 1971.

Early life and career

Odin Langen was born in Minneapolis, Minnesota. His family moved to Kennedy, Minnesota around 1914. He  attended the public schools and Dunwoody Institute in Minneapolis from 1933 to 1934. He engaged in farming in Kittson County near Kennedy, Minnesota and was associated with Production Marketing Administration in Kittson County, Minnesota from 1935 to 1950.

Political career

Langen was a member of the Kennedy (Minnesota) School Board and served as its president from 1948 to 1950. Langen also served on the South Red River Town Board from 1947 to 1950.
He was elected to the Minnesota House of Representatives where he served from 1950 to 1958. He became the Republican leader in the state house in 1957.

In 1958, he ran for the United States House of Representatives against the incumbent DFL Party representative Coya Knutson. Although Knutson was initially expected to win the race, her husband released a letter now known as the “Coya Come Home” letter publicly pleading with her to give up her career in Washington. The letter damaged her campaign and Langen won by 1,390 votes.

He won re-election five times serving on the Agriculture and Appropriations. In 1970, Langen faced off against Robert Bergland, whom he defeated in 1968. Bergland, a farmer and former Agriculture Department official, benefited from local agricultural concerns and defeated Langen.

Later career
After his defeat, he became Administrator of the Packers and Stockyards Administration of the United States Department of Agriculture from January 1971 to April 1972, when he resigned to resume farming pursuits in Kennedy, Minnesota.

Personal life
He was married to Lillian Clauson (1911–1988) with whom he had three children. Odin Langen died in 1976. His funeral was held at the Red River Lutheran Church in Kennedy, Minnesota.

References

External links

1913 births
1976 deaths
Farmers from Minnesota
Politicians from Minneapolis
People from Kittson County, Minnesota
Republican Party members of the Minnesota House of Representatives
American Lutherans
American people of Norwegian descent
Republican Party members of the United States House of Representatives from Minnesota
School board members in Minnesota
United States Department of Agriculture officials
20th-century American politicians
20th-century Lutherans